Edge of the Earth is the second full-length album from British heavy metal band Sylosis, released on 11 March 2011. It is the first release to feature lead guitarist Josh Middleton performing vocals, replacing former lead vocalist Jamie Graham and also first release to feature their current rhythm guitarist, Alex Bailey. The band released a single, "Empyreal (Part 1)", in January 2011.

Track listing

Personnel
Sylosis

Josh Middleton – lead guitar, lead vocals
Alex Bailey – rhythm guitar
Carl Parnell – bass
Rob Callard – drums, percussion

Production and design
  Scott Atkins – producer, engineering, mixing
 Dan Goldsworthy – artwork

References

2011 albums
Sylosis albums
Nuclear Blast albums